Roquestéron is a commune in the Alpes-Maritimes department in southeastern France.

History
It was part of the historic County of Nice until 1860 as Roccasterone.

Population

Climate
Roquestéron had a weather station between 1987 and 2008. It has a humid subtropical climate (Köppen Cfa) characterized by volatile temperatures, heavy precipitation varied with dry spells, and high diurnal temperature variation.

See also
Communes of the Alpes-Maritimes department

References

Communes of Alpes-Maritimes
Alpes-Maritimes communes articles needing translation from French Wikipedia